Manfred Henri Ekwé Ebélé (born 30 September 1988) is a French footballer who plays as a midfielder.

Career 
Ekwé Ebélé was born in Marseille. He began his career 2004 in the youth from RC Strasbourg Alsace, before in August 2008 promoted to first played here his first game on 17 January 2009 against Dijon.

References

External links
 
 

1988 births
Living people
French sportspeople of Cameroonian descent
French footballers
Footballers from Marseille
Association football defenders
Ligue 2 players
Championnat National players
Championnat National 2 players
Championnat National 3 players
Regionalliga players
RC Strasbourg Alsace players
R.E. Virton players
FC 08 Homburg players
SR Colmar players
ASC Biesheim players
FC Saint-Louis Neuweg players
Racing Besançon players
French expatriate footballers
French expatriate sportspeople in Germany
Expatriate footballers in Germany